New Moon is a 1955 Italian musical crime melodrama film directed by Luigi Capuano.

Plot summary

Cast 
 Achille Togliani as Giovanni Randi
 Virna Lisi as Lucia
 Eduardo Ciannelli as Don Giuseppe
 Barbara Shelley as Amira
 Beniamino Maggio as Beniamino
 Turi Pandolfini as Domenico
 Leda Gloria as Mother of Giovanni
 Marc Lawrence as Pierre
 Carlo Tamberlani as Lawyer

References

External links
 

1955 films
1955 crime drama films
Italian crime drama films
Films directed by Luigi Capuano
Films scored by Mario Nascimbene
Melodrama films
Italian black-and-white films
1950s Italian films